Gyas titanus is a species of harvestman found in Europe. It is the biggest European species of harvestman.

Description 
This species of harvestman has long, thick legs. The male's body size ranges from 7 to 8 mm and the female's from 10 to 12 mm, and it is black in both sexes. The chelicerae and pedipalps have a whitish color. The abdomen is clearly segmented and there are white lines between the segments.

Habitat and ecology 
This species lives close to rivers and water bodies; it always appears in habitats with constant humidity levels, avoiding direct sunlight. Immatures can be found along the year, overwintering in caves, and adults appear from June to September.

References 

MERINO SÁINZ, Izaskun and FERNÁNDEZ-ÁLVAREZ, Fernando Ángel "Gyas titanus Simon, 1879". Asturnatura.com [online]. Num. 393, 07/10/2012 [consulted: 29/04/2018]. Available at <https://www.asturnatura.com/especie/gyas-titanus.html>. ISSN 1887-5068.

Harvestmen
Animals described in 1879